C73 or C-73 may refer to :
 Boeing C-73, a 1933 military aircraft
 C-73 (Michigan county highway)
 Ruy Lopez chess openings ECO code
 Thyroid cancer ICD-10 code
 Caldwell 73 (NGC 1851), a globular cluster in the constellation Columba